Mackenzie District is a local government district on New Zealand's South Island, administered by the Mackenzie District Council. It is part of the larger Canterbury Region.

Geography

Principal settlements
The Mackenzie District only has three towns with a permanent population over 300 at the 2013 census:
Fairlie (pop. 690) – seat of the district
Twizel (pop. 1,140) – the district's largest town
Tekapo (pop. 370)

Other smaller settlements include:
Mount Cook Village
Albury
Burkes Pass

Geographical features
Rivers:
Mackenzie Basin
Mackenzie River
Tekapo River
Pukaki River
Grays River

Mountains:
Aoraki / Mount Cook

Lakes:
Lake Tekapo and the 'Church of the Good Shepherd'.
Lake Pukaki
Lake Ruataniwha, one of New Zealand's main rowing venues
Lake Ōhau

Glaciers:
Tasman Glacier
 Hooker Glacier

Skifields:
Fox Peak
Mt Dobson
Round Hill
Tasman Glacier Heliski

National parks:
Aoraki / Mount Cook National Park

Climate
The Mackenzie District has a dry temperate-continental climate with clear, crisp snowy winters and long, hot summers.  Autumn is known for being a riot of colour, while spring brings wildflowers blooming throughout the region, including lupins. The warm summer season is from November to February, with temperatures often passing 30 degrees. In the cooler winter season, from June to September, temperatures drop to below 0 degrees Celsius overnight, while sunny winter days average around 8 degrees and regular snowfall.

History
The MacKenzie Basin was named in the 1850s by and after James Mckenzie, a Scottish-origin shepherd and sheep thief, and the name transferred to the modern district.

Demographics

Mackenzie District had a population of 4,866 at the 2018 New Zealand census, an increase of 708 people (17.0%) since the 2013 census, and an increase of 1,065 people (28.0%) since the 2006 census. There were 1,863 households. There were 2,511 males and 2,352 females, giving a sex ratio of 1.07 males per female. The median age was 40.6 years (compared with 37.4 years nationally), with 801 people (16.5%) aged under 15 years, 978 (20.1%) aged 15 to 29, 2,274 (46.7%) aged 30 to 64, and 810 (16.6%) aged 65 or older.

Ethnicities were 86.4% European/Pākehā, 6.8% Māori, 1.2% Pacific peoples, 8.9% Asian, and 3.4% other ethnicities. People may identify with more than one ethnicity.

The percentage of people born overseas was 24.5, compared with 27.1% nationally.

Although some people objected to giving their religion, 51.7% had no religion, 37.1% were Christian, 1.1% were Hindu, 0.2% were Muslim, 1.2% were Buddhist and 1.5% had other religions.

Of those at least 15 years old, 777 (19.1%) people had a bachelor or higher degree, and 702 (17.3%) people had no formal qualifications. The median income was $33,400, compared with $31,800 nationally. 555 people (13.7%) earned over $70,000 compared to 17.2% nationally. The employment status of those at least 15 was that 2,451 (60.3%) people were employed full-time, 660 (16.2%) were part-time, and 30 (0.7%) were unemployed.

Economy

In 2012, the Mackenzie District had 850 businesses who employed 1900 full time equivalent staff and generated $190 million dollars in revenue. The economy is based on hydroelectric generation, farming (including aquaculture) and tourism.

Of the 267 farms in the Mackenzie District in 2012, 34% of these were sheep farms, 18% sheep and beef cattle, and 15% beef cattle. Minimal amounts of crop farming occurs in the Mackenzie District with small amounts of barley (7,733 tonnes) and oats (2,265 tonnes) grown.

A relatively sparsely settled area, the district does have a wide number of farms. However, in the late 2000s, numerous proposals for new farming operations have locals fearing that the agriculture will be transformed from often family-held farms to large agribusiness operations, causing increased local ecologic damage and siphoning off capital overseas.

List of mayors

References

External links

 Mackenzie District Council
 Mackenzie area history